FINCA Uganda Limited, also known as FINCA Uganda, is a microfinance deposit-accepting institution (MDI) in Uganda. It is licensed and regulated by the Bank of Uganda, the central bank and national banking regulator.

Location
The coordinates of the company headquarters are 00°20'07.0"N, 32°35'16.0"E (Latitude:0.335278; Longitude:32.587778).

Overview
FINCA Uganda was licensed as an MDI in 2004, although the institution has been in the country since 1992.

FINCA provides financial services to Uganda's lowest-income entrepreneurs with the aim of alleviating poverty through lasting solutions that help people to create jobs, build assets, and improve their standard of living. As an MDI, FINCA Uganda is a Tier III Financial Institution. It is therefore prohibited from dealing in foreign exchange and cannot issue checking accounts.

As of December 2015, the institution's asset base was UGX:128.51 billion, with shareholders' equity of UGX:42.67 billion.

FINCA Uganda was one of the first financial institutions in Uganda to introduce biometric technology in 2011.

Ownership
It is a subsidiary and member organization of FINCA International, headquartered in the United States.

Products and services
As of 2014, the financial services offered by FINCA Uganda included:

Branches
As of June 2014, FINCA Uganda maintained 26 inter-linked branches nationwide, at the following locations:

 Ben Kiwanuka Branch - 22 Ben Kiwanuka Street, Kampala
 Katwe Branch - Katwe Road, Katwe, Kampala
 Kireka Branch - Kampala-Jinja Highway, Kireka, Kira Municipality
 Kawempe Branch - Bombo Road, Kawempe, Kampala
 Naakulabye Branch - Hoima Road, Naakulabye, Kampala
 Mukono Branch - Kampala-Jinja Road, Mukono
 Mityana Branch - Station Road, Mityana
 Nakasongola Branch - Lwampanga Road, Nakasongola
 Masaka Branch - Edward Avenue, Masaka
 Kyotera Branch - Bukoba Road, Kyotera
 Sembabule Branch - Mubende Road, Sembabule
 Mbarara Branch - Masaka Road, Mbarara
 Kabale Branch - Kisoro Road, Kabale
 Fort Portal Branch - Rukidi III Street, Fort Portal
 Jinja Branch - Lubas Road, Jinja
 Kamuli Branch - Kitimbo Road, Kamuli
 Iganga Branch - Main Street, Iganga
 Mbale Branch - Republic Street, Mbale
 Busia Branch - Jinja Road, Busia
 Lira Branch - Obote Avenue, Lira
 Gulu Branch - Labwor Road, Gulu
 Arua Branch - Taban Lane, Arua
 Koboko Branch - Central Road, Koboko
 Masindi Branch - Masindi Port Road, Masindi
 Hoima Branch - Old Toro Road, Hoima
 Ntinda Branch - Ntinda Trading Centre, Ntinda Road, Ntinda, Kampala.
 Acacia Branch - 11 Acacia Avenue, Kampala (Head Office)

See also

 Banking in Uganda
 List of banks in Uganda
 List of microfinance deposit-taking institutions in Uganda
 UGAFODE Microfinance Limited
 Pride Microfinance Limited

References

External links
 Website of FINCA Uganda Limited

Banks of Uganda
Companies based in Kampala
1992 establishments in Uganda
Banks established in 1992